Trouble in Paradise is a 1989 Australian TV movie directed by Di Drew and starring Raquel Welch, Jack Thompson, and Nicholas Hammond. The plot concerns a woman who is shipwrecked with a drunken sailor.

The film was shot on location just south of Sydney in Australia. Love scenes between Welch and Thompson were cut, causing Welch to protest. "They just want to make it into pap because they're scared about this, that, everything" said Welch. "I've shot a million love scenes. I've never heard of anything like this.

The film marked a change of pace for Welch after a number of more serious roles.

References

External links

Australian television films
1989 television films
1989 films
Films about survivors of seafaring accidents or incidents
Films about castaways
Films directed by Di Drew
Films scored by Chris Neal (songwriter)
1980s English-language films